Slowdive is the fourth studio album by English rock band Slowdive. It was released on 5 May 2017 by the record label Dead Oceans. It was Slowdive's first studio album in 22 years, following Pygmalion (1995). It was also the band's first album since Souvlaki (1993) to feature the drummer Simon Scott as a member.

Slowdive was preceded by the singles "Star Roving", released on 12 January 2017, and "Sugar for the Pill", released on 28 March 2017.

Critical reception

Slowdive received acclaim from music critics. At Metacritic, which assigns a normalised rating out of 100 to reviews from mainstream publications, the album received an average score of 82, based on 30 reviews.

TJ Kliebhan of Consequence found that Slowdive had "delivered a fresh dream-pop sound that is still uniquely Slowdive", concluding that "Slowdive delivers nearly everything their fans desire in a return: familiarity, innovation, and vast atmospheres to get lost in." The Skinnys Duncan Harman said that the album "represents an awareness of legacy, and the importance of not pissing all over it; to that extent, it's an essential addition to canon." Drowned in Sound reviewer Dom Gourlay called Slowdive a "majestic return that doesn't just fill in the gaps, but points unflinchingly towards future horizons." Sean T. Collins of Pitchfork said that the album "offers maximum-volume shoegaze too, better than the band ever has before", and Cam Lindsay of Exclaim! wrote that it "certainly was a long wait, but finally Slowdive have given us the album that we have been dreaming about for the last 22 years."

Accolades

Track listing

Personnel
Credits are adapted from the album's liner notes.

Slowdive
 Neil Halstead – vocals, guitars, keyboards, editing, production
 Rachel Goswell – vocals
 Christian Savill – guitars
 Nick Chaplin – bass guitar
 Simon Scott – drums, guitar, electronics

Additional personnel

 Ian Davenport – engineering
 Duncan Chave – additional engineering
 Martin Nichols – additional engineering 
 Gareth Stuart – additional engineering
 Steve Clarke – additional vocal engineering
 Chris Coady – mixing
 Sarah Tudzin – mixing (assistant)
 Heba Kadry – mastering
 Josh Bonati – vinyl cut
 Harry Smith – cover art (from Heaven and Earth Magic)
 Ingrid Pop – inner sleeve photography, art direction

Charts

References

External links
 
 

2017 albums
Slowdive albums
Dead Oceans albums